The Newcastle City Baths is a swimming and sports facility located in Newcastle upon Tyne, England. It is a Grade II listed building.

History 
The building was designed by Nicholas & Dixon-Spain and opened in 1927 as a part of a development which also included the adjacent Newcastle City Hall. The city baths formed the west side of the complex and, like the city hall, the design involved a tall portico with central Doric order columns between flanking antae with five square windows above.

In November 2012, Newcastle City Council announced that, as part of a wider cost-cutting process, the future of the City Hall and the adjacent City Baths was under review, with a number of options being considered including closure or handing over the venue to an external operator.

In April 2016 it was announced that the Fusion Lifestyle, a leisure charity, had taken over management of the venue and work commenced on a restoration programme at a cost of £7.5 million, which involved converting the main swimming pool into a gym area while a second, smaller pool, was retained for swimming. The gym and swimming pool re-opened to the public in January 2020.

References

External links 
 
 

Public baths in the United Kingdom
Grade II listed buildings in Tyne and Wear
Grade II listed sports and recreation buildings
Sports venues completed in 1927
Buildings and structures in Newcastle upon Tyne
1927 establishments in England
Listed sports venues in England